Hahndorf is a small town in the Adelaide Hills region of South Australia. Currently an important tourism spot, it has previously been a centre for farming and services.

Geography

It is accessible from Adelaide, the South Australian capital, via the South Eastern Freeway.

Climate

Hahndorf has a warm-summer Mediterranean climate abbreviated Csb on the Köppen climate classification scale.

History

The town was settled by Lutheran migrants largely from in and around a small village then named Kay in Prussia and now known as Kije, Lubusz Voivodeship in Poland. Many of the settlers arrived aboard the Zebra on 28 December 1838. The town is named after Dirk Meinerts Hahn, the Danish captain of the Zebra. It is Australia's oldest surviving German settlement.

Early German settlers
During the British colonisation of South Australia, the settlers were mostly British, but some German "Old Lutherans" also emigrated in the early years. The first large group of Germans arrived in 1838, with the financial assistance of the Emigration Fund. Most moved out of Adelaide and to the Barossa Valley and settlements in the Hills such as Hahndorf, living in socially closed communities, by 1842, and did not participate in government until 15 years later.

German influence 

German influence is apparent in Hahndorf and is seen in the traditional fachwerk architecture of the original surviving buildings. There are also many restaurants in the town serving German cuisine.

Due to the First World War in Europe, in 1917 the South Australian Government changed many German place names. The name Hahndorf was changed to Ambleside after the nearby Ambleside railway station. Hahndorf was re-instated as the town's name with the enactment of the South Australia Nomenclature Act of 1935 on 12 December 1935. There are still references to the name Ambleside in and around the town today.

Demographics

At the census 2006 the population was 1,806. In 2016 the population was 2,670.

Government 
Located in the federal division of Mayo, the state electoral district of Heysen, and the local government areas of the District Council of Mount Barker and the Adelaide Hills Council.

Churches 

There are two prominent churches in Hahndorf. St Michael's is the oldest Lutheran church in Australia to still have a worshipping congregation on its original church site. It was founded in 1839. St Michael's is a member of the Lutheran Church of Australia. St Paul's was founded in 1846, as a result of a schism between the Pastor Kavel, and Pastor Fritzsche. This schism is closely linked to the formation of two original Lutheran synods in Australia which coexisted until their merger in 1966.

C3 Adelaide Hills
C3 Adelaide Hills is a church part of the C3 Church Global movement. Previously located in Nairne it moved to Hahndorf around 2007 .

Sports

Hahndorf's sporting clubs including basketball, bowls, netball, cricket, football (Australian rules and Association Football), tennis and softball. The football (both codes), netball and softball clubs are nicknamed The Magpies.

The Hahndorf Bowling Club was established in 1976 and has a full size (nine rink) green, which is a woven carpet surface enabling all weather competition, and a large clubhouse.

The (soccer) Football Club was formed in the early 1980s and plays home games at "Pine Avenue". The senior men compete in the South Australian Amateur Soccer League. They won the 1996 Newsfront Cup and the 2004 Amateur League Division Two title. However, a gradual decline in player numbers from 2013 have seen the side drop to one team, competing in Division Seven, by 2019.

Notable residents
Watercolour artist Sir Hans Heysen established "The Cedars" close to the town in 1912. He lived and painted there until his death in 1968. "The Cedars" remains in his family, and is open for guided tours.
Matthew Jaensch was an AFL footballer who played for the Adelaide Crows. He retired in 2016 after six years and 74 games with the Crows.

Gallery

See also
 German Australian
 Danish Australian
 Polish Australian

References

External links

 Tourist Information on Hahndorf
 Flinders Ranges Research – Hahndorf
 Adhills – Hahndorf, South Australia
 Captain Hahn's narrative of the voyage
 SA Government State Heritage Areas
 State Heritage Area – Hahndorf
 
 The History of Hahndorf

Towns in South Australia
Hahndorf
Populated places established in 1839
1839 establishments in Australia
German-Australian culture